Subhradeep Ganguly (born 25 October 1980) is an Indian former cricketer. He played two first-class matches for Bengal in 2002/03.

See also
 List of Bengal cricketers

References

External links
 

1980 births
Living people
Indian cricketers
Bengal cricketers
Cricketers from Kolkata